Boys Don't Cry may refer to:

Film
 Boys Don't Cry (1999 film), an American film starring Hilary Swank
 Boys Don't Cry (2000 film), a Polish film directed by Olaf Lubaszenko

Literature
 Boys Don't Cry (novel), a 2010 novel by Malorie Blackman

Music
 Boys Don't Cry (band), a one-hit wonder British studio band known for "I Wanna Be a Cowboy"
 Boys Don't Cry, a record label and magazine founded by Frank Ocean in 2016

Albums
 Boys Don't Cry (The Cure album) or the title song (see below), 1980
 Boys Don't Cry (Rumer album), 2012
 Blonde (Frank Ocean album), working title Boys Don't Cry, 2016

Songs
 "Boys Don't Cry" (The Cure song), 1979, also covered by Nathan Larson for the 1999 film soundtrack
 "Boys Don't Cry" (Moulin Rouge song), 1987
 "Boys Don't Cry", by MC Chris from Eating's Not Cheating, 2004
 "Boys Don't Cry", by Natalia Kills from Trouble, 2013
 "Boys Don't Cry", by Plumb from Beautiful Lumps of Coal, 2003
 "Boys Don't Cry", by Ulrik Munther from Ulrik Munther, 2011
 "Boys Don't Cry", by Anitta from Versions of Me, 2022
 "Boys Don’t Cry", by Camila Cabello from Familia, 2022

See also
 Big Boys Don't Cry (disambiguation)
 "Boys Do Cry", an episode of the TV series Family Guy, which parodied the film
 Once Upon a Time in Seoul, a 2007 South Korean film, the Korean title of which means "Boys Don't Cry"